Alexandra Road may refer to:

 Alexandra Road, Singapore, in Bukit Merah, Singapore
 Alexandra Road, Swansea